Estádio Municipal da Marinha Grande is a football stadium in Marinha Grande, Portugal.  It hosts football matches  for Atlético Clube Marinhense and hosted the home matches of U.D. Leiria in 2002-03 when Estádio Dr. Magalhães Pessoa was being renovated. The stadium is able to hold 6,000 people and opened in 1992.

In 2011–12, U.D. Leiria relocated again to Marinha Grande for 3 years, claiming excessive rent at Estádio Dr. Magalhães Pessoa, after it was relegated, the deal was abandoned and U.D. Leiria moved to Campo da Portela in Santa Catarina da Serra.

References

External links
Venue information
Municipality of Marinha Grande

Marinha Grande
Sport in Leiria
Buildings and structures in Leiria District
Sports venues completed in 1992